Sankar Adhya (born 4 October 1937) is a molecular biologist and geneticist at the National Cancer Institute (NCI) and a member of the National Academy of Sciences. He is best known for his work on bacterial transcription and the biology of bacteriophage lambda.  He has made important contributions regarding the physical basis of transcriptional regulation in bacteria, the lysis/lysogeny switch in lambda phage, the organization of the bacterial nucleoid, and phage therapy.

Life
Adhya was born in Kolkata, India and studied chemistry at the University of Calcutta as an undergraduate. He later obtained a Ph.D. from the University of Calcutta in biochemistry and a second Ph.D. in genetics from the University of Wisconsin–Madison. Following postdoctoral training at Stanford University, the Bose Institute, and the University of Rochester, he joined the NCI's newly formed Laboratory of Molecular Biology (LMB) in 1971. He has remained at the NIH since 1971 and is presently Head of the LMB's Developmental Genetics section.

Awards and honors
 Elected to the National Academy of Sciences in 1994.
 Elected to the Indian National Science Academy in 1995.
 Elected to the American Academy of Arts and Sciences in 2009.
 Elected to the Hungarian Academy of Sciences in 2010 as a foreign member.

Selected publications

References

Indian molecular biologists
Genetic epidemiologists
American geneticists
Living people
University of Calcutta alumni
Stanford University alumni
University of Wisconsin–Madison College of Agricultural and Life Sciences alumni
1937 births
Members of the United States National Academy of Sciences
Foreign Fellows of the Indian National Science Academy
Fellows of the American Academy of Microbiology